The 2020 EHF European Men's Handball Championship was the 14th edition of the tournament and the first to feature 24 national teams. It was co-hosted for the first time in three countries – Austria, Norway and Sweden – from 9 to 26 January 2020.

Spain won their second consecutive title by defeating Croatia 22–20 in the final.

Venues

Qualification

Qualified teams 

Note: Bold indicates champion for that year. Italic indicates host for that year.

Draw 
The draw was held at the Erste Bank Campus in Vienna on 28 June 2019.

Seeding 
The seedings were announced on 17 June 2019.

Squads

Match officials 
On 21 August 2019, 23 couples were announced. On 27 December 2019, EHF replaced the Serbian referee pair Nenad Nikolić and Dušan Stojković with the Latvian referee pair Zigmārs Sondors and Renārs Līcis, due to an injury and late recovery of Nikolić in late October.

Preliminary round 
All times are local (UTC+1).

Group A

Group B

Group C

Group D

Group E

Group F

Main round 
Points and goals gained in the preliminary group against teams that advance were transferred to the main round.

Group I

Group II

Knockout stage

Bracket

Semi-finals

Fifth place game

Third place game

Final

Ranking and statistics

Final ranking 
The teams ranked fourth in each group after the completion of the preliminary round matches were ranked 18 to 24, while teams ranked third in each group after the completion of the preliminary round matches were ranked 13 to 18 according to the number of points won in the preliminary round. Places seven or eight were attributed to the two teams ranked fourth in the groups, places nine and ten were attributed to the two teams ranked fifth in the groups, places eleven and twelve were attributed to the two teams ranked sixth in the group according to the number of points won by the respective teams after completion of the main round matches. Places one to six were decided by play–off or knock–out.

All-Star Team 
The all-star team and awards were announced on 26 January 2020.

Awards

Statistics

Top goalscorers

Top goalkeepers

References

External links 
Official website

 
International sports competitions in Stockholm
International sports competitions in Malmö
International sports competitions in Gothenburg
Sports competitions in Vienna
Sport in Graz
Sports competitions in Trondheim
European Championship, Men, 2020
European Championship, Men, 2020
European Championship, Men, 2020
2020 in Swedish sport
2020 in Norwegian sport
2020 in Austrian sport
European Men's Handball Championship
European Championship, Men
2020 in European sport
2020s in Vienna
2020s in Stockholm
2020s in Gothenburg
2020s in Malmö
21st century in Trondheim
Events at Malmö Arena